"Miss Chatelaine" is a song by Canadian singer-songwriter k.d. lang, released in 1992 as the second single from her second solo album, Ingénue (1992). The song was nominated for a Grammy Award in the category for Best Female Pop Vocal Performance, one year after her win in the same category for "Constant Craving". The title refers to the Canadian magazine Chatelaine, which named lang Woman of the Year in 1988. The accompanying music video was directed by American photographer and director Rocky Schenck.

Critical reception
Larry Flick from Billboard wrote, "Lang lovingly pays homage to Lawrence Welk on this dreamy entry from her brilliant Ingénue set. The crowning glory, of course, is lang's virtually flawless vocal performance." James Muretich from Calgary Herald viewed the song as "upbeat". A reviewer from Cash Box named it a "standout" cut from the album, noting the "Latin beat and accordion-and string backing". 

The Daily Vault's Jason Warburg stated, "She can get playful", as in the "rather campy" "Miss Chatelaine". Stephanie Zacharek from Entertainment Weekly remarked that "with its sidewalk-café accordion accents", the song "could be the theme from a '60s French comedy about a happy-go-lucky heartbreaker who surprised herself by falling in love". Parry Gettelman from Orlando Sentinel felt it "has a pretty string arrangement and moves along at a nice clip". People Magazine said the massed Modern Jazz Quartet, New York Philharmonic and R.E.M. "couldn't have propped up" such tracks as the "sing-songy" "Miss Chatelaine".

Charts

Release history

References

External links
 "Miss Chatelaine" at Allmusic.com
 "Miss Chatelaine" at Discogs.com

1992 songs
1992 singles
K.d. lang songs
Sire Records singles
Songs written by Ben Mink
Songs written by k.d. lang
Warner Records singles